Donis may refer to:

 Donis, a Lithuanian ambient, neofolk and experimental music project created by the Klaipėda multi-instrumentalist Donatas Bielkauskas
 Anastasios Donis, a Greek professional footballer
 Christos Donis, a Greek professional footballer
 Giorgos Donis, a Greek former professional footballer